Princess Lalla Malika  (14 March 1933 – 28 September 2021) was a sister of the late King Hassan II of Morocco, and daughter of King Mohammed V of Morocco and his second wife, Lalla Abla bint Tahar. She was the chairwoman of the Moroccan Red Crescent from 1967 until her death.

At the Dar al-Makhzen in Rabat, on 16 August 1961, she was married (in a triple ceremony with her sisters, Aisha, Fatima and their husbands) to Mohamed Cherkaoui (1921–2022), Ambassador to France 1961–1964, President of the Permanent Consultative Committee of the Maghreb 1964, Minister for Finance and the National Economy 1964–1965, for Development 1965–1966, Foreign Affairs 1966–1967, and National Defence 1967, President of the Afro-Asian Economic Co-operation.

They had the following children:

 Moulay Sulaiman Cherkaoui.
 Moulay Omar Cherkaoui.
 Moulay Mehdi Cherkaoui.
 Lalla Rabia Cherkaoui.

Honours
 Dame Grand Cordon of the Order of the Throne (Kingdom of Morocco).

References 

1933 births
2021 deaths
Moroccan princesses
Moroccan exiles in Madagascar
'Alawi dynasty
People from Rabat
20th-century Moroccan people
21st-century Moroccan people
Daughters of kings